South Hadley High School is a secondary school in South Hadley, Massachusetts, United States, for students in grades 9–12. The school has a student population of just over 700. The school's name is frequently referred to as "SHHS".

Phoebe Prince bullying incident 

Having moved in 2009 to South Hadley from Ireland, Phoebe Prince was taunted and bullied for several weeks by at least two groups of students at South Hadley High School, following disputes with two girls in late December 2009. On January 14, 2010, three students engaged in persistent taunting and harassment of Prince.  Prince subsequently died by suicide by hanging herself in the family apartment. After her death, many crude comments about her were posted on her Facebook memorial page, most of which were removed. 

Other parents subsequently stated that bullying of their children had been completely ignored by the school administration. Massachusetts state lawmakers sped up efforts to pass anti-bullying legislation as a result. 

On March 29, 2010, two male and four female teenagers from South Hadley High School were indicted as adults on felony charges stemming from the incident, ranging from statutory rape, criminal harassment, stalking, juvenile delinquency, to assault with a deadly weapon. 

The district attorney directly contradicted claims by the school superintendent that school officials had been unaware of the bullying:

In May 2011, the case was resolved, after agreements to plead guilty to lesser charges. Five of the defendants were placed on probation, with several also sentenced to community service. The charges against a male student were dropped at the request of the Prince family.  Prince's mother settled with the town of South Hadley in October 2010, in which she agreed not to sue or reveal details of the settlement.

Notable alumni
 Arthur Whittemore, Justice of the Massachusetts Supreme Judicial Court from 1955 to 1969.
 Don Abbey, college football player

References

Schools in Hampshire County, Massachusetts
Public high schools in Massachusetts
South Hadley, Massachusetts